The list of female NBA coaches includes all women coaches who have been assistant and/or head coach in the National Basketball Association (NBA).

List

List of assistant coaches

See also
List of current NBA head coaches

Notes
 Nationality indicates a coach's representative nationality.
 Career in the NBA

References

National Basketball Association lists
Foreign
Lists of women by occupation
NBA coaches